Gladys Marlene Wasden (August 15, 1932 – November 23, 2020), known professionally as Abby Dalton, was an American actress, known for her television roles on the sitcoms Hennesey (1959–1962) and The Joey Bishop Show (1962–1965), and the primetime soap opera Falcon Crest (1981–1986).

Life and career
Dalton was born Gladys Marlene Wasden on August 15, 1932 in Las Vegas, Nevada. Dalton had three children by her marriage to Jack Smith, including Kathleen Kinmont, an actress who closely resembles her mother. Kinmont was married to Lorenzo Lamas, Dalton's onscreen son in Falcon Crest.

Television

Dalton made numerous appearances on television. James Garner and Clint Eastwood engaged in a fist fight over Dalton in the episode "Duel at Sundown" of Maverick. In 1958, she played the love interest of gunfighters on Have Gun Will Travel, starring Richard Boone and The Rifleman, starring Chuck Connors. She appeared as Eloise Barton in an episode of the Western series Jefferson Drum, starring Jeff Richards.

From 1959 to 1962, Dalton played nurse Martha Hale on Hennesey (she was nominated for an Emmy Award for her role) with former child star Jackie Cooper in the title role, and she portrayed Joey Bishop's wife on The Joey Bishop Show from 1962 to 1965. As the Hennesey series was ending, The Joey Bishop Show was preparing for the start of its second season on NBC. Dalton played the role of Ellie Barnes, the wife of Joey Barnes (Bishop). As the season began on September 15, 1962, Dalton and Bishop are shown as newlyweds Ellie and Joey Barnes. Hennesey'''s finale was aired two days later on September 17, 1962, with Martha Hale's marriage to Chick Hennesey. Hence, Dalton portrayed being married to two different titular television sitcom characters on two different networks within two days.

Dalton was a semi-regular panelist on NBC and syndicated Match Game and appeared in the early years of Hollywood Squares. Dalton also appeared on Super Password, with Bert Convy as the host, and guest-starred on the interview program Here's Hollywood.

Dalton was cast in the original pilot for what became the ABC series Barney Miller as Barney's wife. However, this version of the pilot, for a show titled The Days and Nights of Captain Barney Miller, was rejected by the network, and the role wound up being recast with Barbara Barrie. In 1977, she appeared in an episode of the crime drama The Feather and Father Gang.

In the 1980s, Dalton played winemaker Julia Cumson on Falcon Crest. In the show, Julia is the daughter of Angela Channing (Jane Wyman) and the mother of Lance Cumson (Lorenzo Lamas). Julia was at quiet odds with her mother, Angela, and for the show's first two seasons, she was troubled, but a nonviolent person. In the second-season finale, however, she was revealed to be a killer. Much of the third season focused on her dealing with life both in prison and a mental institution, and toward the end of the season, her character escaped from the mental institution to try to kill her mother. Julia was believed to have been killed in the second to last episode, but soon into the fourth season, she was revealed to be still alive. She returned sporadically during the fifth and sixth seasons, but did not reappear after 1986. After leaving the series, Dalton had guest-starring roles on Hotel and Murder, She Wrote.

Dalton also was a TV game player and regular on Stump the Stars (1964), PDQ (1970) and Match Game (1973-74). She appeared on The Rifleman in the episode "The Marshal" as hotel clerk Nancy Moore.

Movies
In 1957, Dalton played roles in the Roger Corman films Teenage Doll, Carnival Rock, and The Saga of the Viking Women and Their Voyage to the Waters of the Great Sea Serpent. Her first leading role was in the 1957 film Rock All Night produced by American International Pictures. The following year, she starred in Stakeout on Dope Street, Girls on the Loose, The High Cost of Loving and Cole Younger, Gunfighter. In 1966, Dalton played Calamity Jane in The Plainsman with Don Murray, and appeared in the rarely-seen film A Whale of a Tale (1976), with William Shatner and Marty Allen. Her later films included the Don "The Dragon" Wilson movie CyberTracker (1994), Buck and the Magic Bracelet (1999), and the horror film Prank'' (2008).

Death
Dalton died on November 23, 2020 in Los Angeles after a long illness.

Filmography

References

External links

1932 births
2020 deaths
Actresses from Las Vegas
American film actresses
American soap opera actresses
American television actresses
Actresses from Los Angeles
20th-century American actresses
21st-century American actresses